Richard L. Bancells (born November 11, 1955) is an athletic trainer who was the long-time Head Athletic Trainer for the Baltimore Orioles of Major League Baseball (MLB) from 1984 to 2017. Bancells has been widely credited with helping Cal Ripken Jr. achieve his record-breaking streak of 2,632 consecutive games played. In 2011, he was elected to the Baltimore Orioles Hall of Fame. On October 1, 2017, shortly before the Orioles final game of 2017, it was announced that Richie Bancells was retiring at the end of the season. At the time of his retirement, he was the longest-tenured member of the Orioles organization.

Education
In 1978, Bancells graduated from Miami's Biscayne College (now St. Thomas University). Richie received his master's degree from Eastern Kentucky University in 1981.

Professional career
Bancells started his professional athletic training career in 1978 with the Bluefield, West Virginia, Orioles, the major league team's single-A rookie club. His first day on the job coincided with Cal Ripken Jr.'s first day of playing professional Baseball. In 1980, he joined the staff of the Rochester Red Wings, then the Triple-A affiliate of the Baltimore Orioles located in Rochester, New York. In 1984, he was promoted to Assistant Athletic Trainer of the major league team and assumed the head athletic trainer position in 1988. His long-time assistant athletic trainer has been Brian Ebel. Bancells has served 3 terms as the President for the Professional Baseball Athletic Trainers Society, and currently serves on the executive committee as Past President.

Marriage and children
Richie lives in Parkton, Maryland, with his wife, Carol. They have three children, Christopher, Andrea, and Timothy, and seven grandchildren.

Awards
 1995 Major League Training Staff of the Year
 2011 Major League Training Staff of the Year
 2011 Orioles Advocates Herbert E. Armstrong Award
 2011 NATA Most Distinguished Athletic Trainer Award

References

External links

 Baltimore Orioles
 Interview of Richie Bancells

1955 births
Living people
People from Key West, Florida
Major League Baseball trainers
St. Thomas University (Florida) alumni
Eastern Kentucky University alumni